The Gold Over America Tour, also referred to as Athleta Presents Gold Over America Tour, was a gymnastics tour headlined by Simone Biles.

Background 
In late 2019, Simone Biles announced her plans to launch a post-Olympic all-woman tour that would be a mixture of sports and entertainment intended to inspire the next generation of female athletes. UCLA gymnast Katelyn Ohashi was the first cast member announced that would join the tour.  The tour featured exhibitions in 35 cities and had been described as a "gymnastics-meets-pop-concert spectacular".  Numerous high-profile gymnasts joined the tour, including 2020 Olympians Jade Carey, Jordan Chiles, Grace McCallum, and MyKayla Skinner and fan-favorites Morgan Hurd, Laurie Hernandez, and Chellsie Memmel.

Cast

Tour dates

See also 
 The Tour of Gymnastics Superstars

References

External links 
 official website

2021 in gymnastics
Gymnastics in the United States